The Noosa Festival of Surfing was established in 1992 at Noosa, Queensland by members of the Noosa Malibu Club, as an amateur surfing competition called the Noosa Malibu Classic. It allowed club members to invite friends to surf Noosa's right-hand point breaks and the event's popularity among competitive longboarders gave the club a chance to take the event to a higher level. In 1996 a professional division was introduced and prompted the name change to The Noosa Festival of Surfing (NFoS) in 1998. The World Tandem Surfing Championships (for  tandem surfers) were brought to Noosa in 1999 and Stand up paddle surfing was incorporated into the Festival in 2007 with live entertainment and fundraising auctions also being held. In 2008, the festival, sponsored by Global Surf Industries and maintained and managed by USM Events, commenced with the traditional Mixing of the Waters ceremony led by Hawaiian waterman Brian Keaulana. The Noosa Festival of Surfing is an official Association of Surfing Professionals (ASP) Longboard rated event.

Background
Noosa was truly the heart of Australian surfing in the late 50s and early 60s, with some great innovations in surfboard design. Most notably, the shorter boards they were riding at the time. In the early sixties, Kevin Platt, one of Australias and arguably the worlds more influential shapers, designed the early shorter transitional boards under influence from George Greenough . He was working at the time for Hewston Surfboards. A later and shorter advancement of these designs can be seen ridden in the Paul Witzig 1967 film "The Hot Generation". Trevor Hewston was the first board builder in Noosa from around 1958 and although managing to stay "underneath the radar", his influence on surfboard design through the following decades was nothing less than outstanding. Trevor is still innovating today with advancements in epoxy technology.

The points at Noosa produce long peeling waves with perfect barrel sections. In those days a perfect wave could be shared amongst a few friends and you could camp at the end of Hastings street. Noosa today suffers from overcrowding and the unfortunate reality of development and urban sprawl. However, a good wave can be snagged if you're early and it will be guaranteed a memorable one.

Since 2012 the festival has also included the Noosa Surfing Dog Championship, Australia’s oldest and biggest dog surfing event.

Log Pro Final results

See also

 Noosa Surfing Dog Championship

List of festivals in Australia

References

External links 
 2008 Noosa Festival of Surfing Full Results - All Events
 Promo Video for Noosa Festival 2007
 Noosa Festival of Surfing Website
 Global Surf Industries

Surfing competitions in Australia
Sport in the Sunshine Coast, Queensland
Recurring events established in 1992
Festivals in Queensland
Recurring sporting events established in 1992
1992 establishments in Australia
Shire of Noosa